The Ferrari F1-75 (also known by its internal name, Project 674) is a Formula One racing car designed and constructed by Scuderia Ferrari which competed in the 2022 Formula One World Championship.

The car was driven by Charles Leclerc and Carlos Sainz Jr. The chassis is Ferrari's first single seater under the 2022 FIA Technical Regulations. The F1-75 scored four wins, from the Bahrain, the Australian, the British and the Austrian Grands Prix, and 20 podiums from its 22 races. The car made its competitive debut at the 2022 Bahrain Grand Prix.

South African engineer Rory Byrne, although not officially credited, was heavily involved in the design of the F1-75. As the car proved successful in the first part of the season, his contract was renewed for three years.

Competition and development history 

The name refers to the 75th anniversary since the first Ferrari production car rolled out of the factory in Maranello.

The F1-75 was used in a tyre test following the Emilia Romagna Grand Prix and was investigated after it appeared to have been run with a new floor specification that had not been previously used. The FIA ruled that the floor had been previously used during pre-season testing and was, therefore, compliant with the regulations.

Compared to the winless 2020 and 2021 cars, the F1-75 was immediately competitive; the team took pole and a dominant victory at the first race in Bahrain. This feat was repeated in Australia, despite the team's reluctance to add updates to the car. Compared to its main rival, the Red Bull RB18, the F1-75 often displayed superior cornering speeds, but the RB18 was better on the straights. Leclerc took four consecutive poles from Miami to Baku, but the team failed to convert any of these poles to wins through a combination of unreliability and poor strategy. At the British Grand Prix, Sainz took pole and won his first Formula One race. At the following race in Austria, the F1-75 took another victory with Leclerc, who achieved his 5th Grand Prix victory.

However, despite being competitive in the first half of the season, the F1-75 suffered from porpoising and poor engine reliability; to address that, Ferrari downtuned the engines at the 2022 Belgian Grand Prix. The porpoising was addressed by FIA's Technical Directive 39 which took effect at the same race. However, reports emerged that the Technical Directive caused the F1-75 to suffer increased tyre wear in subsequent races.

In November 2022, Mattia Binotto stated that Ferrari could not afford to upgrade the car due to them having hit the cost cap, which further contributed to the car's downturn in competitiveness in the second half of the season.

Complete Formula One results
(key)

References

External links
 Official website

F1-75
2022 Formula One season cars